Bellinghem is a commune in the Pas-de-Calais department of northern France. The municipality was established on 1 September 2016 and consists of the former communes of Herbelles and Inghem.

See also 
Communes of the Pas-de-Calais department

References 

Communes of Pas-de-Calais

Communes nouvelles of Pas-de-Calais
Populated places established in 2016
2016 establishments in France